The Procurator (prokuror) was an office initially established in 1722 by Peter the Great, the first Emperor of the Russian Empire, as part of reforms to bring the Russian Orthodox Church more directly under his control.

The Russian word also has the meaning of prosecutor.

The Chief Procurator (also Ober-Procurator; обер-прокурор, ober-prokuror) was the official title of the head of the Most Holy Synod, effectively the lay head of the Russian Orthodox Church, and a member of the Tsar's cabinet. Konstantin Pobedonostsev, a former tutor both of Alexander III and of Nicholas II, was one of the most powerful men to hold the post, from 1880 to 1905.

The  General Procurator (Procurator General) and the Chief Procurator were major supervisory positions in the Russian Governing Senate, which functioned from 1711 to 1917, with their meaning changing over time. Eventually Chief Procurator became the title of the head of a department of the Senate.

List of Most Holy Synod Ober-Procurators
 1722–1725 Ivan Boltin
 1725–1730 Aleksei Baskakov
 1730–1740 no appointments
 1740–1741 Nikita Krechetnikov
 1741–1753 Yakov Shakhovskoy
 1753–1758 Afanasiy Lvov
 1758–1763 Aleksei Kozlovskiy
 1763–1768 Ivan Melissino
 1768–1774 Pyotr Chebyshyov
 1774–1786 Sergei Akchurin
 1786–1791 Apollos Naumov
 1791–1797 Aleksei Musin-Pushkin
 1797–1799 Vasiliy Khovanskiy
 1799–1802 Dmitry Khvostov
 1802–1803 Aleksandr Yakovlev
 1803–1817 Aleksandr Golitsyn
 1817–1833 Pyotr Meshcherskiy
 1833–1836 Stepan Nechayev
 1836–1855 Nikolay Protasov
 1855–1856 Aleksandr Karasevskiy
 1856–1862 Aleksandr Tolstoy
 1862–1865 Aleksei Akhmatov
 1865–1880 Dmitry Tolstoy
 1880–1905 Konstantin Pobedonostsev
 1905–1906 Aleksei Obolenskiy
 1906–1906 Aleksei Shirinskiy-Shikhmatov
 1906–1909 Pyotr Izvolskiy
 1909–1911 Sergei Lukianov
 1911–1915 Vladimir Sabler
 1915–1915 Aleksandr Samarin
 1915–1916 Alexander Volzhin
 1916–1917 Nikolai Raev
 1917–1917 Vladimir Lvov
 1917–1917 Anton Kartashev

See also
 Procurator General of the USSR

Government of the Russian Empire
Titles
Most Holy Synod